

Events

February 

 3 February – The 2017 Copeland by-election is held. Conservative candidate Trudy Harrison gains the seat from Labour, the first gain for a governing party in a by-election since 1982. Labour win the Stoke-on-Trent Central by-election.
 26 February – Father of the House of Commons and veteran Labour MP Gerald Kaufman passes away at the age of 86.

April 

 20 April – The 2017 Manchester Gorton by-election is cancelled following the announcement of an impending general election. This was the first time a UK by-election had been cancelled since 1924.

June 

 8 June – The 2017 United Kingdom general election is held.

References 

2017 in British politics
United Kingdom politics and government
Political timelines of the United Kingdom